"Pop Bottles" is the first single from Birdman's third studio album, 5 * Stunna. The track features rapper Lil Wayne. The track also samples his song "Put Ya Hands Up." The song has since sold over 3,690,000 copies.

In the music video for the song, Birdman and Lil Wayne are depicted playing basketball, in a video game entitled "Popping Bottles".

Young Money Entertainment's T-Streets and Mack Maine make cameos in the video along with Cash Money Records' All Star Cashville Prince and Brisco.

Track listing
"Pop Bottles" (Remix) feat. Lil' Wayne & Jadakiss
"Pop Bottles" (Explicit)
"Pop Bottles" (Instrumental)

Freestyles
Pop Bottles Freestyle - Jim Jones Feat. Max B & DJ Scoob Doo
Pop Bottles Freestyle - Fabolous

Charts
The song peaked at #38 on the Billboard Hot 100, making it Birdman's second highest peak on the chart.

Weekly charts

Year-end charts

Certifications

References

2007 singles
2007 songs
Birdman (rapper) songs
Lil Wayne songs
Cash Money Records singles
Music videos directed by Benny Boom
Songs written by Birdman (rapper)
Songs written by Lil Wayne
Crunk songs